Ivana Buden (born 10 September 1985) is a Croatian compound archer. She has won medals at the major World Archery Federation competitions, the World Cup and the World Archery Championships. The highest ranking she has reached is the first position, which she reached for the last time in July 2009.

Achievements
Source:

2004
31st, European Outdoor Championships, individual, Brussels
 European Grand Prix, individual, Wyhl
2005
42nd, World Outdoor Championships, individual, Madrid
4th, Summer Universiade, individual, İzmir
2006
 World Cup, women's team, Antalya
7th, European Outdoor Championships, individual, Athens
2007
5th, World Indoor Championships, individual, İzmir
6th, World Outdoor Championships, individual, Leipzig
2008
 World Cup, individual, Santo Domingo
4th, European Outdoor Championships, individual, Vittel
 World Cup, individual, Antalya
2009
20th, World Indoor Championships, individual, Rzeszow
 World Cup, individual, Poreč
9th, Summer Universiade, women's team, Belgrade
12th, Summer Universiade, individual, Belgrade
22nd, World Outdoor Championships, individual, Ulsan
 World Cup Final, individual, Copenhagen

2010
9th, European Outdoor Championships, women's team, Rovereto
9th, European Outdoor Championships, mixed team, Rovereto
17th, European Outdoor Championships, individual, Rovereto
2011
 World Cup, individual, Antalya
17th, World Outdoor Championships, individual, Turin
27th, World Outdoor Championships, mixed team, Turin
2012
17th, World Indoor Championships, individual, Las Vegas
7th, Indoor World Cup Final, individual, Las Vegas
5th, European Outdoor Championships, individual, Amsterdam
7th, European Outdoor Championships, mixed team, Amsterdam
9th, European Outdoor Championships, women's team, Amsterdam

References

External links
 

Croatian female archers
Living people
1985 births
World Archery Championships medalists
World Games bronze medalists
Competitors at the 2009 World Games
World Games medalists in archery